Widescreen baroque is a style of science fiction writing "characterized by larger-than-life characters, violence, intrigue, extravagant settings or actions, and fast-paced plotting". It is closely aligned with, and an outgrowth of, space opera fiction.

The term widescreen baroque was coined by Brian Aldiss (as "wide-screen baroque") in his 1973 work The Billion Year Spree in reference to works by E.E. Smith and A.E. van Vogt.

Authors associated with widescreen baroque include: 

Stephen Baxter
Barrington Bayley
Alfred Bester
Samuel Delany
Charles L. Harness
Stanislaw Lem
Mariko Ohara
Alastair Reynolds
E.E. Smith
A.E. van Vogt

References

Science fiction genres